Fernand Piet (Paris, August 26, 1869 - Paris, February 24, 1942) was a French painter. Firstborn son of Jules Piet and grandson of Charles Mozin.

Biography 
Piet was a student of Eugène Carrière, Fernand Cormon and Alfred Roll.

At the Salon des Indépendants and the Salon des artistes français he exhibited his canvases and engravings of landscapes of Brittany. Holland and the South, and representations of common scenes: parks, children, markets. Piet is also the author of numerous female nudes and rare seascapes.

The economic wealth that his family provides him and the fortunate financial speculations on the Stock Exchange, allow him to lead a comfortable social life with his friends Lucien-Victor Guirand de Scevola, Edmond Lempereur and Jean-Louis Forain.

In 1905 he became with Paul Signac deputy director of the Salon des Indépendants.

In 1910 he received the honor of the Order of Academic Palms.

Between 1985 and 2003, 8 sales at the Hôtel Drouot dispersed Piet's atelier.

Expositions 

 Galerie du Théâtre d'Application (la Bodinière) 1893
 Esposizione internazionale d'arte di Venezia, Biennale de Venise 1899
 Exposition de la Sécession viennoise, Viennae (Austria) dicembre 1899
 Grosse gemälde Ausstellung des Kunstvereins in Bremen, Kunsthalle de Brême, Germania 1900
 Exposition universelle de 1900 Parigis, medaglia di bronzo
 Exposition universelle de Bruxelles 1910
 Exposition au profit des œuvres de guerre (maggio-giugno 1918) N°377 bis Marché à la poterie à Quimperlé
 Salon des indépendants di 1893 al 1925
 Salon des artistes français
 Galerie Interkunst München, Der maler Fernand Piet und die Belle Epoque  dal 15/11/1968 al 15/01/1969 e dal 02/06/1969 al 30/06/1969
 Galerie Barthelmess & Wischnewski, Berlin dal 12 aprile al 7 giugno 2014 Die Entdeckung des Alltäglichen (Le Jardin du Luxembourg)

Museums 

 Musée de l'Ermitage (Saint-Pétersbourg), Marché a Brest(1899). antica collezione Sergueï Chtchoukine.
 Neue Pinakothek München. Le Square Montholon (1891)

References

Bibliography 

 L'Estampe Moderne (volume 2 nº 141) Marché en Zélande 1898
 Die kunst und das schöne heim (1968.Thiemig München) heft11. articolo di A.Sailer:Fernand Piet ein maler der belle époque
 Fernand Piet: Leben und werk, Erich Steingräfen (Bruckmann 1974)
 Catalogue de la 1ére vente d'atelier, Hôtel Drouot 1985: bibliothèque du Musée Rodin.
 French art treasures at the hermitage. Albert Grigorevitch Kostenevich (ed: Harry N.Abrams 1999)
 signaturen lexikon Pfisterer Paul (de Gruyter Berlin, New-York 1999)P439
 Catalogue de la 6éme vente d'atelier, Hôtel Drouot étude Chochon Barré et Allardi 29 octobre 2001: bibliothèque Kandinsky centre Pompidou

Other projects 

  Wikimedia Commons contiene immagini o altri file su Fernand Piet

External links 
 (EN)  Fernand Piet in Artcyclopedia

19th-century French painters
1869 births
1942 deaths
20th-century French painters